Falsomordellistena bihamata is a species of tumbling flower beetle in the family Mordellidae. It is found in North America.

References

Further reading

 

Mordellidae
Articles created by Qbugbot
Beetles described in 1845